Harlan Page Prince (June 9, 1837 – March 5, 1899) was an American sea captain in the 19th century. He began going to sea at the age of fifteen in a career that lasted for forty years. He commanded eight ships during his career. 

Upon retirement, he became a member of the Maine House of Representatives.

Life and career 
Prince was born to Captain Reuben Prince and Deborah Drinkwater, their youngest son. He was educated in the public schools of North Yarmouth, Maine, then at North Yarmouth Academy.

At the age of fifteen, he began to go to sea. Ship-building at Yarmouth harbor was in full swing, and he became interested in becoming captain of one of the ships. His ambition came to fruition, and he commanded the following ships:

 Aeronaut
 Emma
 Agenora
 Ester
 B. Webster
 Onaway
 Carrie Heckle
 Wm. G. Davis

Upon his father's death in 1870, Harlan inherited the property now known as the Captain Reuben Prince House at 210 Gilman Road in today's Yarmouth. It remained in the Cushing family until Harlan's death.

He retired from the seas in 1892, when he was captain of the Wm. G Davis, and became a member of the United States House of Representatives for the State of Maine.

Prince was married twice: firstly to Annie Cushing Prince, with whom he had one daughter, then to Clara Blanchard Gooding, with whom he had two children: Harlan Page Jr. (who died around the age of fifteen) and Jessie May.

In 1896, he was elected to represent the towns of Yarmouth and North Yarmouth in the House. He was re-elected two years later.

Death 
Prince died on March 5, 1899, at his home, after a week-long bout of sickness. He was sixty-one years old. According to W. C. Fogg, of Freeport, Maine, Prince had left the Maine State House on February 24 apparently in "perfect health"; soon after arriving home, however, he contracted a severe cold, which turned into pneumonia.

He was buried in Yarmouth's Riverside Cemetery. His wife was interred beside him upon hear death fifty-five years later at the age of 92 or 93.

References 

1837 births
1899 deaths
People from Yarmouth, Maine
Sea captains
People from North Yarmouth, Maine
North Yarmouth Academy alumni
Members of the Maine House of Representatives